The 2020 Copa MX Finals was the final of the 2019–20 Copa MX, the fifteenth edition of the Copa MX under its current format and 82nd overall organized by the Mexican Football Federation, the governing body of association football in Mexico.

The final was contested in a two-legged home-and-away format between Monterrey and Tijuana. The first leg was hosted at Estadio Caliente in Tijuana on 21 October 2020, while the second leg was hosted at Estadio BBVA in Guadalupe on 4 November 2020. The finals were scheduled to take place on 8 and 22 April 2020 but were postponed due to the COVID-19 pandemic in Mexico. It was later announced the finals would be held on 16 and 23 September but were later postponed again to 21 October and 4 November 2020.

Qualified teams

Venues

Background
Monterrey has won the tournament twice while Tijuana has never won it. Before reaching this final, the last time Monterrey reached a final of any kind was the Apertura 2019 Liga MX final where they defeated América on penalty kicks to capture their fifth league title. The last time Tijuana reached a final of any kind was the Apertura 2012 Liga MX final where they defeated Toluca 4–1 on aggregate to capture their first Liga MX title.

Monterrey won all four of their group stage matches as they were seeded first. They eliminated Celaya in the round of 16, Santos Laguna in the quarterfinals, and Juárez on penalty kicks in the semifinals.

Tijuana won three, drew none and lost one in the group stage as they were seeded sixth. They eliminated Atlético San Luis in the round of 16, Morelia in the quarterfinals, and Toluca in the semifinals.

Road to the finals
Note: In all results below, the score of the finalist is given first.

Matches

First leg

Second leg

Monterrey won 2–1 on aggregate

References

Copa MX Finals
2019–20 in Mexican football
2020 in Mexican sports
C.F. Monterrey matches
October 2020 sports events in Mexico
November 2020 sports events in Mexico